Omphalomia accersita is a species of snout moth. It was described by Charles Swinhoe in 1894. It is found in India.

References

Moths described in 1894
Pyralinae